Birnam Wood is a town in Scotland.

Birnam Wood or Birnamwood may also refer to:

Birnamwood, Wisconsin
Birnamwood (town), Wisconsin
 Birnam Wood, a novel by Eleanor Catton

See also
Birnam Oak, an Oak tree in Birnam Wood, Scotland